The Orhuwhorun people

“Ogba kwo Orhuwhorun mue en”  which means an attempt formed to capture her people can not succeed. This old saying was birthed in 1901 after George Eyube died from an accidental shot fired from his own pistol during a patrol from Orokpo to Orhuwhorun with an attempt of bringing the people under firmer control.

The Orhuwhorun people are sometimes referred to as Ugbede and Obodo people, they reside in the north eastern part of Udu Local Government Area of Delta State Nigeria.

The land is surrounded by neighbouring communities. Ekete in north, Owhrode in the south, Egini in the east and Usieffrun (Urhiephron) in the west. Some communities like Ovwian, Arhagba and Igbogidi form boundaries in the south-west and the south-east of Orhuwhorun.

According to the 2006 census figures Udu local government has a population of 142480 and Orhuwhorun is inclusive. Orhuwhorun has grown to be the second prominent and fast developing town in the Udu environ, due to the establishment of Delta Steel Company housing complex built in the 1970s for its workers. With this township Orhuwhorun developed and moved from being a rural area to an urban center.

The Urhobo language predominantly spoken by them is known as Udu.

In customs, they have a distinct annual festival that includes, Unueje, "Chechegbe" masquerade, and an annual epha female festival" literally known as  "emeteyavwon" and "jabojawo" at which initiated daughters parade the streets of the town half naked to mark the coming of a new age.

They also have to themselves an autonomous kingdom which was obtained from Aka (Benin) by a man named Okaka from eyenduvwon now Ekrovie quarters around the year 1715 to 1717 . The king in Orhuwhorun as in every other Urhobo communities is called the Ovie and greeted as Oghievworo! Oghievworo!! Osieran!!! wo su ton, and he is assisted by the council of chiefs and elders (Iletu, Ilorogun, Igbu-irue and Irehren).

Account of migration 

Oral interviews and myth from legends and published sources has it that Orhuwhorun founding father named Omiere migrated from the present day Uwheru in Ughelli North Local Government Area of Delta State. They migrated around the 15th century to the present-day Otor-udu. Omiere and his group were not the only migrants that moved out from Uwheru. Owerhiave and his wife Ekperhie left Uwheru around the same time the Omiere party left and founded Ekwerhe in Agbarho. Also Enyuto, a part of Oyede in Isoko, was said to have moved out from Uwheru at the same time when Omiere migrated. Another man also migrated from Uwheru and formed a part of Ibredeni in Ndokwa local Government Area of Delta State.

Villages that migrated from Uwheru formed Amassama and Kokori and Ibredeni in the Kwale division. There was a war between the Omieres and the Ijaws in which Egi and Sogun, the two Ijaw warriors were killed in retaliation for the death of a man in Omiere's camp. This conflict led to the migration of Omiere and his people to the present-day Udu Local Government area.

Migration from Uwheru to Otor-Udu 

According to oral myths, the present-day Otor-udu is where Omiere and his family first settled following a clash with the ijaw warriors. The family traveled south and pitched a camp near the present day Otorogo gas plant. Before long, they had another problem of insecurity with Ovo. 
Ovo was the rebel supreme commander of the fighting force of Udu. He was said to be envious of Omiere's military might. At one time Ovo had a secret plan to wipe out Omiere and his people. He made the Orhuwhorun (Omiere) people to dig a big hole in the ground and work in it. While the Omiere people were busy in the pit, he poured buckets of boiling water in the pit with the intention to roast them alive. 
Unfortunately for him, Omiere escaped with his family and pushed further north again to a new place called Owhrode.

However, the Orhuwhorun people are believed to have been settled in Otor-Udu before the Udu party came. The relics and confirmation of the first arrivals in the area is the belief of the Orhuwhorun man, that the remaining Udu groups came much later and so whenever the other Udu groups wants to talk about the Orhuwhorun man, they respectfully refer to them as “Orhuwhorun -ekpako” which means the Orhuwhorun people are seniors   This is a common belief among the people that gives authenticity to the longevity of the Orhuwhorun people in the Udu environment.

The present day Owhrode community in Udu local government area of Delta state, about a 2 kilometers south away from the present abode of Orhuwhorun was where Omiere moved his family to and settled temporarily for some years after he escaped from Ovo leadership force. Here, he removed his residence further to find their present location which was named after one of the earlier arrivals as Ugbede and later changed to Obodo before changing finally to Orhuwhorun in 1976. The name Orhuwhorun is a corrupt form of Orho-Ughweru which literary means a village from Uwheru.

Their migration from Owhrode to their present abode was necessitated by water scarcity. In other word they moved out from Owhrode in search of regular water supply. It was this unbearable situation that made the Omiere people to move their residence further south in search of a land that has rivers and streams. This natural quest to get a better form of existence drove them further toward their present abode Orhuwhorun where they saw a natural permanent water supply which they were looking for

The Orhuwhorun anthem 

Ukpe tere, ovie ka tota meke tota,
Orhuwhorun yo-orhe, oke unueje kelere,
Ovie kiriare, echa-bo-ronye ewokpahon,
Iletu te’ irheren, ayen-je kiria kele, 
Igbu-iwrhe ebovo, ilorogun kebewoba,
Orere-jobi, avwitiyin roro ma,   Ovie avwen kiriare,  Ewrho ogodor jobi kpasa,

Oyovwi r’ Okaka oduvie r’ Orhuwhorun.

Orhuwhorun gini yovwi, Ofo-orere avwi-owohor   Ovie avwen kiriare 
             
Eh ya eh eh...

Arho oyen etogbe eh not

English translation.
     
The season is due for the king to speak before others, Orhuwhorun proclaim, festival season is near. The king is seated, together with nobles. Warriors, votaries, and Chiefs           converse with one another declearing, Our king is crowned and seated, His works are due with admiration. Thanks to Okaka who bequeathed us with royalty.

Stanza two

The land is blessed and fit to be called a home, Our king is crowned His judgments are fair Join me rejoice (repeatedly

Further reading 
O. Ikime: Niger Delta Rivalry,Itsekiri Urhobo Relations and the Europeans presence 1884–193. London; Longman Group Limited 1969.

 Perkins Foss: where gods and mortals meet; Continuity and Renewal in Urhobo Art, New York: Museum for African Art and Snoeck Publishers 2004

 G.G Darah: Battle of songs: Udje tradition of the Urhobo. Lagos Malthouse Press Limited 2005.

 Otite Onigue: The Urhobo people:Second Edition, Ibadan: Shaneson C.I. Limited, 2003 pg 74. 
 Derm, Lambert: Intelligent Report on Uwheru clan 1932 National Archive Ibadan
 Urhobo Vanguard dated 18. 2004
 June 2013: letter to the Editor by Gibson Ogheneochuko Fenfe in a form of rejoinder to a paid advert in the Vanguard newspaper dated May 7, 2013 by the Udu people in Great Britain and Ireland.

 Treaty with Kings and Chiefs of Obodo, Intelligence Report on  Obodo clan 1930  The treaty can be found in Ref  No. 406 of 1886, dated 27 May  1895 and drawn up between her  Brittanic Majesty and Kings and  Chiefs of Obodo. It was in the  customary form in which treaties  of peace, commence and  protection were drafted at the  time and embodied the usual nine articles. It was signed by the  Vice-consul of the Niger  protectorate, Major W.E.B  Copland-Crawford on behalf of  Her Brittanic Majesty and by  eight ‘Soi-distance’ Chiefs of  Obodo.
  2013: letter to the Editor by Gibson Ogheneochuko Fenfe in a form of rejoinder to a paid advert in the Vanguard newspaper dated May 7, 2013 by the Udu people in Great Britain and Ireland.

References
 Orhuwhorun Monarch Visit Oba of Benin. (2012) Retrieved from Urhobo Times Press Ltd
 Letter to Editor. Urhobo Vanguard. 

Populated places in Delta State